Hotel Andaluz is a historic high-rise hotel in Downtown Albuquerque, New Mexico. It opened in 1939 as the Hilton Hotel, part of the Hilton Hotels chain. After operating under various names since the 1970s, the hotel was renovated and reopened under its current name in 2009. In 2019 it joined the Curio Collection by Hilton brand.

The property was listed (as Old Hilton Hotel) on the New Mexico State Register of Cultural Properties in 1983 and the National Register of Historic Places in 1984. It has also been designated an Albuquerque historic landmark.

History
Opened on June 9, 1939, the Hilton was the first modern high-rise hotel in New Mexico. It was one of the first hotels in Conrad Hilton's Hilton Hotels chain and the first Hilton-branded hotel outside the state of Texas. Architect Anton F. Korn designed the 160-room ten-story building in the New Mexico Territorial Revival style, with earthtone stucco, brick coping along the roofline, and southwest-style woodwork and furnishings. After a new Hilton opened near the Big I freeway interchange in 1971, the older hotel was sold in 1974 and rebranded as the Hotel Plaza. It was sold again in 1981 and closed. The new owners planned to restore it as the Hotel Bradford, but the hotel sat vacant and never opened under that name. The hotel was finally renovated in 1984, with the number of rooms reduced to 114, and reopened on August 3, 1984 as La Posada de Albuquerque.

In 2005, the hotel was purchased by Gary Goodman, whose company Goodman Realty Group is also behind the upcoming Winrock Town Center. In March 2008, the hotel underwent an extensive $30 million renovation and restoration, reopening as Hotel Andaluz on October 1, 2009. The hotel was honored with LEED Gold certification for its sustainability, and has been recognized many times over the years by Conde Nast as one of the top hotels in the U.S. southwest. The property features Más Tapas y Vino, a Spanish-influenced "dining experience" under the helm of Executive Chef Marc Quinones. It also offers the Ibiza Urban Rooftop Lounge and an extensive live entertainment program on weekends.  of conference facilities.

During 2019, the hotel was used as a location for scenes in the fifth series of the television drama Better Call Saul.

In its National Register listing it was deemed "exceptionally significant in  the  city as the  last of  Albuquerque's three great 'southwestern' hotels. Like the  Alvarado Hotel (built 1903, demolished 1969) and  the  Franciscan Hotel (built 1923, demolished 1972), the Hilton reflects the building techniques of  its  time while displaying the  traditional New Mexican decor which denotes the city's importance as  a  regional tourist center. In  the  old  Hilton the  generous use  of  local crafts and materials was combined with the most advanced building techniques available just before World War II. In  its  heyday it served the  city as  a  social and  political center before giving way to  newer hotels built farther east near the new freeways."

In 2019, the hotel became part of the Curio Collection by Hilton chain, returning it to Hilton branding.

References

External links 

Hotel Andaluz (official site)
Hotel Andaluz (Emporis)

Hotel Andaluz
Skyscraper hotels in Albuquerque, New Mexico
Hotel buildings on the National Register of Historic Places in New Mexico
Hotels established in 1939
Hotel Andaluz
Hotel Andaluz
Hotel Andaluz
National Register of Historic Places in Albuquerque, New Mexico
Hotel buildings completed in 1939